Gracillaria arsenievi is a moth of the family Gracillariidae. It is known from the island of Hokkaidō in Japan and the Russian Far East.

The wingspan is 10.0-13.2 mm.

The larvae feed on Fraxinus americana, Fraxinus chinensis, Fraxinus mandshurica, Fraxinus pennsylvanica, Syringa amurensis, Syringa reticulata and Syringa vulgaris. They mine the leaves of their host plant. The mine starts as upper epidermal and tortuous-linear, and later becomes a blister-like blotch. The leaf roll made by the larva of the late instars is conical or trigonal, always rolled up from the tip of the leaf or leaflet on the lower side. The cocoon is situated on the edge of a living leaf around the leaf roll. It is whitish and boat-shaped. The species probably hibernates in the adult stage.

References

Gracillariinae
Moths of Japan
Moths described in 1977